Andfiskvatnet is a lake in the municipality of Rana in Nordland county, Norway. The lake flows out into the river Andfiskåga which flows into the Ranfjorden.

See also
 List of lakes in Norway

References

External links
 

Lakes of Nordland
Rana, Norway